Mohammed A. Salameh (born September 1, 1967 in the West Bank) is a Palestinian convicted terrorist and perpetrator of the 1993 World Trade Center bombing. He is currently serving an unknown sentence as an inmate at FCI Terre Haute in Terre Haute, Indiana for taking part in the attack on New York.

Early life
Salameh's family fled the West Bank with him in 1967, shortly after he was born there, because of the Six-Day War.

Illegal immigrant
He entered the United States on a six-month tourist visa in 1988 but then overstayed. He was still in the country illegally in 1993 during the World Trade Center bombing. He applied for an immigration amnesty under a 1986 law that set up the Special Agricultural Worker program despite never having been eligible. However, he was still guaranteed work authorization until the Immigration and Naturalization Service could rule on his applications. It took the INS nearly five years to determine he was ineligible for any of the programs for which he had applied. Even then, he was not deported.

Role in World Trade Center bombing
Salameh's 1978 Chevy Nova was used to ferry the nitric acid and urea used to construct the bomb used in the past 1993 bombing.

Despite failing his driving test four times, Salameh had been the driver for the group. On January 24, 1993, he jumped a curb and tore the undercarriage from his car, injuring himself and Ramzi Yousef. He was checked out of Rahway Hospital the following day and went to the garage to clean his car while Yousef remained in the hospital for four more days.

With his Nova in for repairs, Salameh got Nidal Ayyad to use his corporate account with Allied Signal to rent him a new car. However, he got in a car accident again on February 16 and collided with a car.

Arrest and sentencing
On March 4, 1993, the FBI arrested Salameh. He had just collected $400 after reporting his rental van had been stolen and speaking with an undercover FBI agent posing as a Ryder "loss prevention analyst". Earlier, the FBI had traced the Ford Econoline van that had been used in the World Trade Center bombing by its vehicle identification number.

In 1994, Salameh was sentenced to 240 years in prison. In 1999, his sentence was reduced to 116 years and 11 months. In 2021, one of his convictions was overturned, cutting his sentence by another 30 years. He is assigned BOP number 34338-054. Salameh was initially sent to ADX Florence, where he was repeatedly force-fed after hunger strikes. He was later transferred to USP Big Sandy, then FCI Terre Haute. Salameh is scheduled for release on May 23, 2067.

Possible link to assassination  of Kahane
An article in the Jerusalem Post quoted from the mid-August 2010 issue of Playboy that El Sayyid Nosair, who had been acquitted of the murder of Meir Kahane, later still claimed that he had two partners with him:

References

External links
 

1967 births
Living people
Palestinian Muslims
Inmates of ADX Florence
People convicted on terrorism charges
People imprisoned on charges of terrorism
Palestinian mass murderers
20th-century criminals
Palestinian people convicted of murder